, known by the stage name , was a Japanese actor, voice actor, and narrator from Kōtō, Tokyo. He graduated from Kamakura Gakuen Senior High School, and was affiliated with Aoni Production at the time of his death. He was married with fellow voice actress Michiko Hirai, until her death.

Nakae narrated numerous Nintendo commercials during 2006. He retired in 2007 due to his failing health; Hitoshi Kubota took over his role as the narrator of the Nintendo commercials, and Ryūzaburō Ōtomo took over his role as the narrator of the Hey! Spring of Trivia game show.

Shinji Nakae died of hepatocellular carcinoma in a Koganei hospital on June 28, 2007 at 12:30 P.M. He was 72 years old.

Filmography

Television animation
Cromartie High School (2003) (Narrator)
Fruits Basket (2001) (Narrator)
Kiniro no Corda ~primo passo~ (xxxx) (Nakata)
Kiteretsu Daihyakka ((xxxx) Yashiro, Honma)
Marmalade Boy (xxxx) (Principal)
One Piece (2003) (Shandia Chief)
Tetsujin 28-Go FX (xxxx) (Commander)
Oh My Goddess! (xxxx) (TV Narrator)
Tekkaman: The Space Knight (xxxx) (Narrator)
Tomorrow's Joe (xxxx) (Hurricane)
Gaiking: Legend of Daiku-Maryu (2005) (Doctor Wong)
Glass Mask (2005) (Narrator, Genzō)

OVA
Blazing Transfer Student (xxxx) (Narrator)
Doki Doki School Hours (xxxx) (Narrator)
Labyrinth of Flames (xxxx) (Narrator)

Film
Prophecies of Nostradamus (xxxx) (Narrator)
The War in Space (xxxx) (Narrator)

Video games
Metal Gear Solid 3: Snake Eater (xxxx) (Lyndon B. Johnson)
Tales of Fandom Vol.2 (xxxx) (Count Steinmetz)
Super Tokusatsu Wars 2001 (2001) (Narrator)
Ace Combat 6 (xxxx) (Narrator, System Voice)

Tokusatsu
Kamen Rider Series (Narrator)
Dai Sentai Goggle V (Goggle Robo)
Ultraseven (Alien Metron and Alien Annon)

References

External links
 Official agency profile 
 

1935 births
2007 deaths
Aoni Production voice actors
Japanese male video game actors
Japanese male voice actors
Male voice actors from Tokyo
People from Kōtō
20th-century Japanese male actors
21st-century Japanese male actors